Bhawanipur (community development block) is one of the administrative divisions of Purnia district in the Indian state of  Bihar.

Geography
Bhawanipur is located at

Panchayats
Panchayats in Bhawanipur community development block are: Barhari, Basantpur Chintaman, Bhawanipur East, Bhawanipur West, Gondwara Patkaili, Jawe, Lathi, Raghunathpur, Sahidganj, Sonama, Sondip Milik, Sripur Milik, Supouli and Suraiti.

Demographics
As per 2001 census, Bhawanipur block had a population of 126,742.

References

Community development blocks in Purnia district